Three ships of the Royal Navy have borne the name HMS Alcide

 was a 64-gun third rate ship of the line, captured from the French in 1755 and sold in 1772.
 was a 74-gun third-rate ship of the line, launched in 1779 and broken up in 1817.
 was an  launched in 1945 and sold in 1974.

Royal Navy ship names